Compsolechia atmastra is a moth of the family Gelechiidae. It was described by Edward Meyrick in 1929. It is found in Peru.

The wingspan is about 15 mm. The forewings are dark bronzy grey with small ill-defined black spots beneath the costa at and near the base, and one beneath the fold hardly beyond the second. There are several small irregular cloudy whitish marks or dots irregularly placed in the median area of the disc and there is a small white transverse wedge-shaped spot on the costa at three-fourths, and a dot on the tornus hardly beyond it. A small black spot is found on the costa near the apex and there are three small white spots (lowest dot-like) before the upper part of the termen, and two small black marks between these. The hindwings are dark fuscous.

References

Moths described in 1929
Compsolechia
Taxa named by Edward Meyrick